Ivanovka is a rural locality (a selo) and the administrative center of Ivanovsky District of Amur Oblast, Russia. Population:

References

Notes

Sources

Rural localities in Ivanovsky District, Amur Oblast